Giselle (Zado) Wasfie is a journalist, magazine editor, fiction author, and former music blogger, who changed careers to become a doctor of Traditional Chinese Medicine. She is also the founder/CEO of REMIX Acupuncture and Integrative Health, LLC, as well as its complementary botanical and organic skincare and aromatherapy line, REMIX by Giselle Wasfie, which has been featured in publications such as Refinery29, Byrdie, and Modern Luxury, among many others.<ref>

Background 

Wasfie received her bachelor's degree from the University of Michigan, Ann Arbor and her master’s in International Journalism from City University, London. She was a student at St Peter's College, Oxford and attended New York University’s prestigious "Summer Publishing Institute", as well as the University of California, Los Angeles "Professional Program in Screenwriting". In 2012, she graduated with a master's degree in Traditional Chinese Medicine, and went on to pursue her doctorate, both from Pacific College of Oriental Medicine. She is a nationally board-certified acupuncturist, and herbalist, and licensed in Illinois, New York, and California.

Career 

After graduating from U of M, Wasfie moved to Manhattan where she began with an editorial internship at US Weekly magazine. From there, she moved to Glamour magazine where she was an editorial assistant to the books editor under Bonnie Fuller. Simultaneously, Wasfie moonlighted as a music correspondent for Sonicnet.com, which was eventually bought out by MTV Networks. She then became a features editor at SOHH.com where she interviewed Gang Starr, Nas, Nelly, and Wyclef Jean.

In 2005, Wasfie’s debut novel "So Fly" was published by St. Martin’s Press. From there, she moved to Los Angeles to be an editor at national independent music magazine URB where she wrote cover stories about Outkast and Lauryn Hill, as well as interviewing artists such as Björk, Beirut, Bat for Lashes, The Coop, José González and Perry Farrell.  In 2007, Public Enemy’s legendary frontman Chuck D became an Executive Producer of the "So Fly" book-to-television project.

Wasfie’s freelance stories have appeared in VIBE, Vice, Black Book, Teen People, Source, HX, CosmoGirl, and MTV.Com.

Book
So Fly, Giselle Zado Wasfie, New York : St. Martin’s-Griffin (2005)

References

American women journalists
Living people
University of Michigan alumni
Alumni of St Peter's College, Oxford
New York University alumni
UCLA Film School alumni
Year of birth missing (living people)
21st-century American women